Rieux is a commune in the Oise department in Hauts-de-France. The inhabitants are called "les Rioliens" and "les Rioliennes".

See also
Communes of the Oise department

References

Communes of Oise